Anadistichona is a genus of flies in the family Tachinidae.

Species
Anadistichona aurata Townsend, 1934

Distribution
Brazil.

References

Exoristinae
Tachinidae genera
Diptera of South America
Monotypic Brachycera genera
Taxa named by Charles Henry Tyler Townsend